Events from the year 1873 in Scotland.

Incumbents

Law officers 
 Lord Advocate – George Young
 Solicitor General for Scotland – Andrew Rutherfurd-Clark

Judiciary 
 Lord President of the Court of Session and Lord Justice General – Lord Glencorse
 Lord Justice Clerk – Lord Moncreiff

Events 
 March – Robert Fleming & Co. founded by Robert Fleming in Dundee as a series of investment trusts including the Scottish American Investment Company (co-founded with William Menzies)
 3 March – the Scottish Rugby Union is formed as the Scottish Football Union
 13 March – the Scottish Football Association is formed, the world's second national football association
 15 November – statue to Greyfriars Bobby erected in Edinburgh
 Edinburgh Evening News first published
 Lexicographer James Murray publishes Dialect of the Southern Counties of Scotland
 George and James Weir move their new pump manufacturing and general engineering business, predecessor of the Weir Group, to Glasgow

Births 
 8 April – James Drever, psychologist (died 1950)
 13 April – James Salmon, architect (died 1924)
 6 July – George Aitken Clark Hutchison, Scottish Unionist MP for Midlothian and Peebles Northern (1922–23, 1924–28) (died 1928)

Deaths 
 24 February – Thomas Guthrie, Free Church preacher and philanthropist (born 1803)
 8 March – Robert William Thomson, engineer, inventor of the bicycle tyre (born 1822)
 1 May – David Livingstone, pioneer medical missionary (born 1813)
 2 October – John Cunningham, architect (died 1799)
 27 October – Janet Hamilton, poet (born 1795)
 Hugh Fraser, retailer (born 1815)

See also 
 Timeline of Scottish history
 1873 in the United Kingdom

References 

 
Years of the 19th century in Scotland
Scotland
1870s in Scotland